The 1986 Brabantse Pijl was the 26th edition of the Brabantse Pijl cycle race and was held in Belgium on 23 March 1986. The race started in Sint-Genesius-Rode and finished in Alsemberg. The race was won by Johan van der Velde.

General classification

References

1986
Brabantse Pijl